The Most Reverend M. Prakash (born 29 January 1949) is present Archbishop of the Visakhapatnam, in the state of Andhra Pradesh in India.

Bishopric

Kadapa
Innayya was first appointed as Bishop of Cuddapah on 22 May 1989 and subsequently ordained as Bishop on 22 July 1998 by the principal consecrator, Bishop S. Arulappa and co-consecrators, Bishop M. John and Bishop G. Bali at the St. Mary's Cathedral in Kadapa.

Vijayawada
On 26 July 1992, the Holy See transferred Prakash from the Diocese of Kadapa to the Diocese of Vijayawada.

Archbishopric
On 3 July 2012, the Holy See again transferred Prakash from the Diocese of Vijayawada to the archdiocese of Visakhapatnam.

References

Telugu people
21st-century Roman Catholic bishops in India
1949 births
Living people
Christian clergy from Andhra Pradesh